The Turów coal mine or KWB Turów, is a large open pit mine in the southwest of Poland, located outside Bogatynia, Lower Silesia. It feeds the nearby Turów Power Station. The mine is scheduled to be shut down by 2044 when its coal reserves are expected to be depleted.

Operations 
Situated 55 km west of Jelenia Góra, 80 km east of Dresden, Germany, and 20 km northwest of Liberec, Czech Republic, the Turów mine forms a part of an area widely known as the "Black Triangle" due to its past heavy industrial pollution, covering portions of eastern Germany, southwestern Poland and northern Czech Republic. The Turów mine, operated by Polska Grupa Energetyczna, represents one of the largest lignite reserves in Poland, with an estimated reserve of 760 million tonnes of coal. The annual coal production of Turów is around 27.7 million tonnes.

Lignite was found near Turasów in 1740. Between 1836 and 1869, almost 70 shafts were excavated. The owners of these mines organized the joint stock company Hercules in 1904, and three years later began strip mining. In 1925 the cap rock was dumped north to the mine. After the Second World War, in 1947, a Polish organization took the mine over from the Soviet military administration and KWB Turów came into existence.

Power Station 

Nearby Turów Power Station is fuelled by lignite extracted from the Turów coal mine. The first unit of the power station was commissioned in 1962. The power station is the fifth largest source of greenhouse emissions in Poland and was the eighth least efficient power station in the EU in 2007. A new 496 MW unit was brought online in May 2021.

Legality 

The mine's license was set to expire in April 2020, but in March 2020, the Polish government extended it by another six years. The Polish government agreed to PGE Group's wish to continue mining at the site until 2044, when its coal deposits are expected to be fully depleted. Later, the Polish government announced that the mine would be shut down by 2044, claiming this to be in line with the EU's plans to cut emissions. PGE Group's move to expand the mine is facing opposition from the Czech government, as nearby Czech and German communities say that the environmental impact from the mine is severely affecting their quality of life, and threatening survival of several villages close to the border by causing their wells to dry up. According to a geological study, continued mining also risks causing soil subsidence in the German town of Zittau. In February 2021, the Czech Republic sued Poland over the mine at the European Court of Justice, the first time that an EU member state had sued another one over an environmental issue.

In May 2021, Poland defied an injunction by the court that ordered the immediate closure of the mine, claiming it would have an adverse impact the country's energy system and lead to the loss of thousands of jobs. The claim was refuted by studies of the renewable energy alternatives for the region, which would produce an estimated 800–4,100 jobs more than the coal mine and plant while saving over 13 billion euros in electricity production costs over 25 years.

Because Poland had not ceased lignite extraction activities at the Turów mine, on 20 September 2021, the Vice-President of the Court ordered Poland to pay the European Commission a daily penalty payment of half a million euros, but the Polish government refused to comply.

Environmental impact 
The Turów coal mine has a significant impact on surrounding areas and their ground and surface waters. An analysis of hydrologist Sylwester Kraśnicki predicts devastating effects on local rivers, including droughts, water shortage, and continued degradation of chemical compositions of the Lusatian Neisse river, among others. Water shortage already causes the surrounding nature to die, while some villages lost access to running water and have to rely on firefighters to deliver water tanks.

Gallery

See also 
 List of power stations in Poland

References

External links 
 Official site 

Buildings and structures in Lower Silesian Voivodeship
Coal mines in Poland
Open-pit mines
Zgorzelec County